Psychomastatix deserticola is a species of grasshopper in the family Eumastacidae. It is endemic to the United States. It is known commonly as the desert monkey grasshopper.

References

Endemic fauna of the United States
Insects described in 1934
Caelifera
Taxonomy articles created by Polbot
Taxobox binomials not recognized by IUCN